Carlos Manuel Merino Campos  (born 11 August 1963) is a Mexican politician affiliated with the National Regeneration Movement party and the current interim Governor of Tabasco after Adán Augusto López Hernández left the position. He previously served as a deputy and senator for Tabasco.

References

1963 births
Living people
21st-century Mexican politicians
Governors of Tabasco
Labor Party (Mexico) politicians
Members of the Chamber of Deputies (Mexico)
Members of the Senate of the Republic (Mexico)
Morena (political party) politicians
Party of the Democratic Revolution politicians
Politicians from Tabasco